This is a list of all described species of Thelyphonidae, adapted from World Uropygi Catalog in 2022.

List 
 Etienneus Heurtault, 1984
 Etienneus africanus (Hentschel, 1899) — West Africa
 Ginosigma Speijer, 1936
 Ginosigma lombokensis Speijer, 1936 — Indonesia
 Ginosigma schimkewitschi (Tarnani, 1894) — southeast Asia
 Glyptogluteus Rowland, 1973
 Glyptogluteus angustus Rowland, 1973 — Philippines
 Hypoctonus Thorell, 1888
 Hypoctonus andersoni (Oates, 1889) — Myanmar
 Hypoctonus binghami (Oates, 1889) — Myanmar
 Hypoctonus birmanicus Hirst, 1911 — Myanmar
 Hypoctonus browni Gravely, 1912 — Myanmar
 Hypoctonus carmichaeli Gravely, 1916 — Bangladesh
 Hypoctonus dawnae Gravely, 1912 — Myanmar
 Hypoctonus ellisi Gravely, 1912 — Myanmar
 Hypoctonus formosus (Butler, 1872) — Myanmar
 Hypoctonus gastrostictus Kraepelin, 1897 — Borneo
 Hypoctonus granosus Pocock, 1900 — China
 Hypoctonus javanicus Speijer, 1933 — Indonesia
 Hypoctonus kraepelini Simon, 1901 — Thailand
 Hypoctonus oatesii Pocock, 1900 — Bangladesh, Bhutan
 Hypoctonus rangunensis (Oates, 1889) — Myanmar
 Hypoctonus saxatilis (Oates, 1889) — Myanmar
 Hypoctonus siamensis Haupt, 1996 — Thailand
 Hypoctonus stoliczkae Gravely, 1912 — India
 Hypoctonus sylvaticus (Oates, 1889) — Myanmar
 Hypoctonus woodmasoni (Oates, 1889) — Myanmar
 Labochirus Pocock, 1894
 Labochirus cervinus Pocock, 1899 — India
 Labochirus proboscideus (Butler, 1872) — Sri Lanka
 Labochirus tauricornis Pocock, 1900 — India
 Mastigoproctus Pocock, 1894
 Mastigoproctus abeli Villarreal & Giupponi, 2009 — Venezuela
 Mastigoproctus annectens Werner, 1916 — Brazil
 Mastigoproctus ayalai Viquez & Armas, 2007 — Venezuela
 Mastigoproctus baracoensis Franganillo, 1931 — Cuba
 Mastigoproctus brasilianus (C. L. Koch, 1843) — Brazil
 Mastigoproctus butleri Pocock, 1894 — Brazil
 Mastigoproctus cinteotl Barrales-Alcalá, Francke & Prendini, 2018 — Mexico
 Mastigoproctus colombianus Mello-Leitão, 1940 — Colombia
 Mastigoproctus formidabilis Hirst, 1912 — Venezuela
 Mastigoproctus giganteus (Lucas, 1835) — United States
 Mastigoproctus lacandonensis Ballesteros & Francke, 2006 — Mexico
 Mastigoproctus maximus (Tarnani, 1889) — Brazil
 Mastigoproctus minensis Mello-Leitão, 1931 — Brazil
 Mastigoproctus perditus Mello-Leitão, 1931 — Brazil
 Mastigoproctus proscorpio (Latreille, 1806) — Dominican Republic, Haiti, Martinique
 Mastigoproctus santiago Teruel, 2010 — Cuba
 Mastigoproctus vandevenderi Barrales-Alcalá, Francke & Prendini, 2018 — Mexico
 Mayacentrum Víquez & Armas, 2006
 Mayacentrum guatemalae Víquez & Armas, 2006 — Belize, Guatemala
 Mayacentrum pijol Víquez & Armas, 2006 — Guatemala, Honduras
 Mayacentrum tantalus (Roewer, 1954) — El Salvador, Guatemala
 Mimoscorpius Pocock, 1894
 Mimoscorpius pugnator (Butler, 1872) — Guatemala
 Ravilops Víquez & Armas, 2005
 Ravilops kovariki Teruel, 2017 — Dominican Republic
 Ravilops wetherbeei (Armas, 2002) — Dominican Republic
 Thelyphonellus Pocock, 1894
 Thelyphonellus amazonicus (Butler, 1872) — Brazil, Suriname
 Thelyphonellus ruschii Weygoldt, 1979 — Guyana
 Thelyphonellus vanegasae Giupponi & Vasconcelos, 2008 — Colombia
 Thelyphonellus venezolanus Haupt, 2009 — Venezuela
 Thelyphonoides Krehenwinkel, Curio, Tacud & Haupt, 2009
 Thelyphonoides panayensis Krehenwinkel, Curio, Tacud & Haupt, 2009 — Philippines
 Thelyphonus Latreille, 1802
 Thelyphonus ambonensis (Speijer, 1933) — Indonesia
 Thelyphonus angustus Lucas, 1835 — unknown
 Thelyphonus anthracinus Pocock, 1894 — Malaysia
 Thelyphonus asperatus Thorell, 1888 — Indonesia
 Thelyphonus billitonensis Speijer, 1931 — Indonesia
 Thelyphonus borneensis Kraepelin, 1897 — Borneo
 Thelyphonus borneonus Haupt, 2009 — Borneo
 Thelyphonus burchardi Kraepelin, 1911 — Indonesia
 Thelyphonus caudatus (Linnaeus, 1758) — Vietnam, Indonesia
 Thelyphonus celebensis Kraepelin, 1897 — Indonesia
 Thelyphonus dammermanni (Speijer, 1933) — Indonesia
 Thelyphonus dicranotarsalis (Rowland, 1973) — Papua New Guinea
 Thelyphonus doriae Thorell, 1888 — Malaysia
 Thelyphonus feuerborni Werner, 1932 — Java
 Thelyphonus florensis (Speijer, 1933) — Indonesia
 Thelyphonus gertschi (Rowland, 1973) — Papua New Guinea
 Thelyphonus grandis Speijer, 1931 — Borneo
 Thelyphonus hansenii Kraeplein, 1897 — Philippines
 Thelyphonus insulanus L.Koch & Keyserling, 1885 — Fiji
 Thelyphonus kinabaluensis Speijer, 1933 — Malaysia
 Thelyphonus klugii Kraepelin, 1897 — Indonesia
 Thelyphonus kopsteini (Speijer, 1933) — Indonesia
 Thelyphonus kraepelini Speijer, 1931 — Indonesia
 Thelyphonus lawrencei Rowland, 1973 — Solomon Islands
 Thelyphonus leucurus Pocock, 1898 — Solomons
 Thelyphonus linganus C.L.Koch, 1843 — Indonesia, Malaysia
 Thelyphonus lucanoides Butler, 1872 — Indonesia, Sarawak
 Thelyphonus luzonicus Haupt, 2009 — Philippines
 Thelyphonus manilanus C.L. Koch, 1843 — Indonesia, Papua New Guinea, Philippines, Thailand
 Thelyphonus nasutus (Thorell, 1888) — Borneo
 Thelyphonus pococki Tarnani, 1900 — Indonesia
 Thelyphonus renschi (Speijer, 1936) — Borneo
 Thelyphonus rohdei (Kraepelin, 1897) — Indonesia, Papua New Guinea
 Thelyphonus samoanus (Kraepelin, 1897) — Samoa
 Thelyphonus schnehagenii Kraepelin, 1897 — Burma
 Thelyphonus semperi Kraepelin, 1897 — Philippines
 Thelyphonus sepiaris Butler, 1873 — India, Sri Lanka
 Thelyphonus seticauda Doleschall, 1857 — Indonesia, Philippines
 Thelyphonus spinimanus Lucas, 1835 — unknown
 Thelyphonus suckii Kraepelin, 1897 — Indonesia
 Thelyphonus sumatranus Kraepelin, 1897 — Indonesia
 Thelyphonus tarnanii Pocock, 1894 — Sumatra
 Thelyphonus vanoorti Speijer, 1936 — Philippines
 Thelyphonus wayi Pocock, 1900 — Cambodia
 Thelyphonus willeyi (Pocock, 1898) — Papua New Guinea
 Typopeltis Pocock, 1894
 Typopeltis cantonensis Speijer, 1936 — China
 Typopeltis crucifer Pocock, 1894 — Japan, Taiwan
 Typopeltis dalyi Pocock, 1900 — Thailand
 Typopeltis guangxiensis Haupt & Song, 1996 — China
 Typopeltis harmandi Kraepelin, 1900 — Vietnam
 Typopeltis kasnakowi Tarnani, 1900 — Thailand
 Typopeltis laurentianus Seraphim, Giupponi & Miranda, 2019 — Vietnam
 Typopeltis magnificus Haupt, 2004 — Laos
 Typopeltis niger (Tarnani, 1894) — China
 Typopeltis soidaoensis Haupt, 1996 — Thailand, Vietnam
 Typopeltis stimpsonii (Wood, 1862) — Japan
 Typopeltis tarnanii Pocock, 1902 — Thailand
 Typopeltis vanoorti (Speijer, 1936) — China
 Uroproctus Pocock, 1894
 Uroproctus assamensis (Stoliczka, 1869) — Bangladesh, Bhutan, Cambodia, India, Nepal
 Valeriophonus Víquez & Armas, 2005
 Valeriophonus nara (Valerio, 1981) — Costa Rica
 †Mesoproctus Dunlop, 1998
 Mesoproctus rowlandi Dunlop, 1998
 †Mesothelyphonus Cai & Huang, 2017
 Mesothelyphonus parvus Cai & Huang, 2017

References 

Thelyphonidae
Thelyphonidae